Oileides is a genus of Neotropical spread-winged skippers in the family Hesperiidae.

Species
The following species are recognised in the genus Oileides:
Oileides fenestratus  (Gmelin, [1790]) - French Guiana
Oileides guyanensis (Mabille & Boullet, 1912) - French Guiana
Oileides vulpinus Hübner, [1825] - Brazil

References

Natural History Museum Lepidoptera genus database

External links
representing Oileides at Consortium for the Barcode of Life

Hesperiidae of South America
Hesperiidae
Hesperiidae genera
Taxa named by Jacob Hübner